Teodoro Paul Paredes Pavón (born 1 April 1993) is a Paraguayan professional footballer who plays as a defender for Club Bolívar.

Career

Club
Paredes started his senior football career in Paraguay with Cerro Porteño, he made his debut for the team on 18 May 2011 in a Paraguayan Primera División draw with Guaraní. He made another six appearances in the 2011 season before making zero in 2012. Eighteen league matches followed for Paredes in 2013 and 2014 though, prior to him leaving Cerro Porteño on loan to join Sol de América. He participated in twenty-seven top-flight fixtures for Sol de América before returning to his parent club. Ahead of the 2016 season, Paredes completed a loan move to fellow Primera División team Rubio Ñu.

However, he returned to Cerro Porteño in May 2016 after just four appearances for Rubio Ñu. Notably, Parades was sent off in his final Rubio Ñu game; vs. Guaraní. Upon arriving back home, he was sent out on loan once again as this time he agreed to sign for Argentine Primera División club Atlético de Rafaela for the 2016–17 campaign. His debut came on 28 August in a league match with Atlético Tucumán. July 2017 saw Paredes go back to Cerro Porteño, where he subsequently featured twice more for the club before leaving on loan for a fourth time in July 2018. Newell's Old Boys loaned him on 30 July.

International
Parades played for Paraguay U17s and Paraguay U20s at international level. He won nine caps for the U20s, with three of those nine matches coming at the 2013 FIFA U-20 World Cup in Turkey.

Career statistics
.

Honours
Cerro Porteño
 Paraguayan Primera División: 2013 Clausura

References

External links
 

1993 births
Living people
People from Caaguazú Department
Paraguayan expatriate footballers
Paraguayan footballers
Paraguay under-20 international footballers
Association football defenders
Paraguayan Primera División players
Argentine Primera División players
Bolivian Primera División players
Cerro Porteño players
Club Sol de América footballers
Club Rubio Ñu footballers
Atlético de Rafaela footballers
Newell's Old Boys footballers
Club Bolívar players
Expatriate footballers in Argentina
Expatriate footballers in Bolivia
Paraguayan expatriate sportspeople in Argentina
Paraguayan expatriate sportspeople in Bolivia